Safiabad (also Romanized as Şafīābād) is a village in Chenaran Rural District, in the Central District of Chenaran County, Razavi Khorasan Province, Iran. At the 2006 census, its population was 243, in 66 families.

References 

Populated places in Chenaran County